Ludovic Castard (born ) is a retired French male volleyball player. He was part of the France men's national volleyball team at the 2006 FIVB Volleyball Men's World Championship in Japan. He is of Guadeloupean descent.

References

1983 births
Living people
French men's volleyball players
Place of birth missing (living people)
Panathinaikos V.C. players
French people of Guadeloupean descent